Jesus "Jsu" Garcia, also credited as Nick Corri (born October 6, 1963), is an American film and television actor and producer. Together with author John-Roger, he runs the production company Scott J-R Productions.

Early life
Garcia was born in New York City as Jesus Garcia, to Cuban immigrant parents. He attended Fairfax High School where he studied acting.

Career
His first role was on the TV show Fame (1982), where he used the stage name Thom Fox. He then appeared in his first film Wes Craven's A Nightmare on Elm Street (1984). This was followed by an appearance in Universal's Gotcha! (1985), and then in features such as Wildcats (1986), Slaves of New York (1989), Vampire in Brooklyn (1995), and Traffic (2000). In 2002 Garcia was in Randall Wallace's We Were Soldiers (2002) in which he portrays Mel Gibson's heroic friend, the commander of a company fighting against the Viet Cong; and in Andrew Davis' Collateral Damage (2002), in which he plays a villainous Communist guerrilla who battles Arnold Schwarzenegger's character. In addition to appearances on TV shows, including JAG (1995), Arli$$ (1996), The Facts of Life, Miami Vice, Babylon 5, She Spies, Crossing Jordan and Murder One (1995), Garcia also played the male lead in an ABC / Touchstone pilot, Then Came Jones, and had a recurring role on Without a Trace (2007). Garcia also played a supporting role in Along Came Polly (2004). Garcia played revolutionary Che Guevara in Andy García's The Lost City. He took part in the 2010 documentary film Never Sleep Again: The Elm Street Legacy discussing his roles in various films in the Elm Street franchise. 
Garcia portrayed Francisco d'Anconia in Atlas Shrugged: Part 1 (2011), based on Ayn Rand's novel of the same name.

Garcia has also acted in theater including a production of Grease and won a Drama-Logue Award for his performance in the play Short Eyes.

Personal life
Garcia is an ordained minister in the Movement of Spiritual Inner Awareness, founded by John-Roger.

Filmography

Film

Television

References

External links
Jsu Garcia's website

1963 births
American male film actors
American male television actors
American stage actors
American people of Cuban descent
Hispanic and Latino American actors
Living people
Male actors from New York City
Movement of Spiritual Inner Awareness